Sinilabeo brevirostris is a species of cyprinid in the genus Sinilabeo. It inhabits Vietnam and is considered harmless to humans. It has not been evaluated on the IUCN Red List.

References

Cyprinid fish of Asia
Fish of Vietnam
Fish described in 2001